Daddy Goes Ptarmigan Hunting is a Canadian drama film, directed by Robert Morin and released in 2008. The film stars François Papineau as Vincent Lemieux, a wealthy financier on the run after facing fraud charges, who is driving through remote northern Quebec and recording a video message for his daughters.

The film was shot in the Baie-James region of Quebec over 10 days. The lead character was based on Vincent Lacroix, the Montreal financier implicated in the Norbourg scandal of 2005.

Morin received two Jutra Award nominations, for Best Director and Best Cinematography, at the 11th Jutra Awards in 2009.

References

External links

2008 films
Canadian drama road movies
Films shot in Quebec
Films directed by Robert Morin
2000s drama road movies
2008 drama films
French-language Canadian films
2000s Canadian films